Cibitung Station (CIT) is a railway station located in Wanasari, Cibitung, Bekasi Regency. The station, which is located at an altitude of +19 meters, is included in the Operation Area I Jakarta.

This station is located a little bit far from the Bekasi Regency–Karawang Regency main road which was decommissioned in 2011. Previously the station was small, 1.5 × 1.5 meters wide and only functions as a ticket sales counter. The station platform is low and short. The station building was then enlarged to meet the extension of the KRL Commuterline blue line towards .

The station is quite busy because it is located near housing complexes.

History

Local station
Before Cibitung Station was built there was a signal post on the location. Many residents of Pondok Tanah Mas housing need to stop and depart the train, because most of them work in Jakarta. Along with the of Pondok Tanah Mas residents interests, Wanasari locals also want the existence of a train station. Over time, Cibitung Station was built to fulfill their needs, not only for Pondok Tanah Mas residents themselves, but also other housings as well as Wanasari residents.

Reopened as commuter station

Since the implementation of 2011 Gapeka (Grafik Perjalanan Kereta Api) timetables, all local trains, either from west or east, did not stop at Cibitung Station. The station closure left the old station building, which contains the station signboard and former ticket sales counter.

In 2015, the station was seen starting to be rebuilt. On 8 October 2017 it was officially reactivated with a new station building and serving the KRL Commuterline for the Jakarta Kota–Cikarang. The new station building has only one platform in the middle of the two rail tracks.

Building and layout 
Cibitung Station has two railway tracks like the Bekasi Timur Station. The new building of Cibitung Station only have one island platform which is placed between two railway tracks.

Services
The following is a list of train services at the Cibitung Station.

Passenger services 
 KAI Commuter
  Cikarang Loop Line (Full Racket)
  Cikarang Loop Line (Half Racket), to / (via  and ) and

Incidents 

 On 8 March 2014, a Haryanto tour bus carrying a group of children was hit by the Menoreh Train while passing the Cibitung 101 railroad level crossing (PJL) next to the former Cibitung Station in the Cikarang Station and Tambun Station compartments which resulted in the locomotive being damaged, but the bus driver  managed to escape and the driver's assistant was secured.

References

Bekasi Regency
Railway stations in West Java
Railway stations opened in 1990